Robert Franklin Durden (May 10, 1925 - March 4, 2016) was an American historian and author at who worked at Duke University. He wrote books about Duke's history, journalist James S. Pike, and historian Carter G. Woodson.

He was born in Graymont, Georgia, to Virgil Edward Durden and Mildred Donaldson Durden. He studied at Emmanuel County Institute and Emory University. He served in the U.S. Navy. He received a Ph.D from Princeton in 1952. He married Anne Oller. He retired from Duke in 2001 and was awarded the University Medal. He died in Durham, North Carolina. 

Duke has a collectiom of his papers. He had two daughters, two granddaughters, and six great grandchildren. His ashes were spread in the Sarah P. Duke Gardens where his wife's ashes were also placed.

Writings
Reconstruction bonds & twentieth-century politics : South Dakota v. North Carolina, 1904 1967
The Launching of Duke University, 1924-1949 1993
The Dukes of Durham and The Launching of Duke University 1987
Electrifying the Piedmont Carolinas: The Duke Power Company, 1904-1997 2001
Bold Entrepreneur: A Life of James B. Duke 2009
The Gray and the Black: The Confederate Debate on Emancipation winner of the Jules F. Landry Award
Carter G. Woodson: Father of African-American History
The Self-Inflicted Wound: Southern Politics in the 19th Century 1985
James Shepherd Pike: Republicanism and the American Negro, 1850-82
The Climax of Populism; The Election of 1896
Lasting Legacy to the Carolinas; The Duke Endowment 1924-1994 1998

References

Duke University faculty

1925 births
2016 deaths
Emory University alumni
20th-century American historians
Princeton University alumni
United States Navy personnel of World War II
21st-century American historians
People from Emanuel County, Georgia
American military historians
Historians of the American Civil War
Historians of North Carolina
Historians of African Americans